The 334th Fighter-Bomber Aviation Squadrons (Serbo-Croatian:  / 334. ловачко-бомбардерска авоијацијска ескадрила) was an aviation squadron of Yugoslav Air Force formed in 1978 at Mostar airfield as 3rd Fighter-Bomber Aviation Squadron of 107th Helicopter Regiment (Serbo-Croatian: / 3. ловачко-бомбардерска авоијацијска ескадрила 107. хеликоптерског пука).

History
The 3rd Fighter-Bomber Aviation Squadron of 107th Helicopter Regiment was equipped with domestic made G-2 Galeb trainer-light attack jet aircraft.

In 1979 the squadron has been transformed into 1st Fighter-Bomber Aviation Squadron of Center for training of foreign armed forces pilots (Serbo-Croatian:  / 1. ловачко-бомбардерска авоијацијска ескадрила Центра за обуку пилота припадника страних оружаних снага). Main task of squadron was training of Libyan Air Force pilots.

With the center being disbanded in 1988, squadron has been attached again to 107th Aviation Regiment and renamed in to 334th Fighter-Bomber Aviation Squadrons. 
Main task of 334th Squadron was training of reserve pilots, cadets of School of Reserve Officers.

In 1990 334th Fighter-Bomber Aviation Squadron ceased to exist due it was disbanded by "Jedinstvo 2" reorganization.

Assignments
107th Helicopter Regiment
Center for training of foreign armed forces pilots (1979-1988)
107th Aviation Regiment (1988-1990)

Previous designations
3rd Fighter-Bomber Aviation Squadron of 107th Helicopter Regiment (1978-1979)
1st Fighter-Bomber Aviation Squadron (1979–1988)
334th Fighter-Bomber Aviation Squadron (1987-1990)

Equipment
G-2 Galeb (1978-1990)

References

Yugoslav Air Force squadrons
Military units and formations established in 1978
Military units and formations disestablished in 1990